Mount Wrightson (O'odham: Ce:wi Duag) is a  peak in the Santa Rita Mountains within the Coronado National Forest, in southern Arizona, United States.

It was named for William Wrightson, a miner and entrepreneur in the region killed by Apaches in the 1865 Battle of Fort Buchanan.

Geography
Its distinctive pyramid-shaped profile is visible from much of southeastern Arizona and adjoining areas in Sonora, Mexico.

The mountain is known for the views from its barren peak, nearly  feet above Tucson.

Flora
Mount Wrightson's flora includes grassy, high desert chaparral, mixed conifers with Arizona, Apache, and Chihuahua pines, Arizona madrone, aspen, oak brush, and Douglas fir and ponderosa pine near the summit.

Fauna
Fauna on Mount Wrightson include birds such as the scrub jay and ravens high up near the peak, Coues white-tailed deer, black bear, and (rarely) mountain lion.

Hiking
These two trails intersect at Josephine Saddle halfway to the peak, so hikers can choose one route for the lower path and one route for the upper.

There are several springs at different locations, including Bog Spring, Sprung Spring, Kent Spring, Armour Spring, Baldy Spring, McBeth Spring and Bellows Spring. Nonetheless, take plenty of water and be aware of wildlife. It is a prime birding area and black bears are common. Two miles into the hike is a saddle which offers an easy dayhike with dramatic views of this peak. It features a Boy Scout Memorial dedicated and maintained for three scouts who died in a storm on Mount Wrightson November 15, 1958.  According to the sign, the plaque was erected by Boy Scout Troop 249 in remembrance of David Greenberg (age 12), Mike Early (age 16), and Michael J. Lanoue (age 13).

The final approach to the summit is north facing and may be impassable without special equipment during the winter due to ice.

The "Florida Fire" in 2005 burned a large expanse of the forest in this area, affecting much of this hike, especially the section between the Walker Basin trail and the Super Trail.

References

External links
 
 

Wrightson
Wrightson
Landforms of Santa Cruz County, Arizona
Coronado National Forest
North American 2000 m summits
Mountains of Santa Cruz County, Arizona